Homaloxestis quadralis is a moth in the family Lecithoceridae. It was described by Kyu-Tek Park and Bong-Kyu Byun in 2007. It is found in Palawan in the Philippines.

References

Moths described in 2007
Homaloxestis